"All Blues" is a jazz composition by Miles Davis first appearing on the influential 1959 album Kind of Blue. In the composition's original key of G this chord is an E7. "All Blues" is an example of modal blues in G mixolydian.

A particularly distinctive feature of the piece is the bass line that repeats through the whole piece, except when a V or VI chord is reached (the 9th and 10th bars of a chorus). Further, there is a harmonically similar vamp that is played by the horns (the two saxophones in the case of Kind of Blue) at the beginning and then (usually) continued by the piano under any solos that take place. Each chorus is usually separated by a four-bar vamp which acts as an introduction to the next solo/chorus.

While originally an instrumental piece, lyrics were later added by Oscar Brown Jr.

Personnel
 Miles Davis – trumpet
 Julian "Cannonball" Adderley – alto saxophone
 John Coltrane – tenor saxophone
 Bill Evans – piano
 Paul Chambers – double bass
 Jimmy Cobb – drums

References

External links 
"All Blues" Analysis, Melody, Chords & Improvisation

Songs about blues
1950s jazz standards
1959 compositions
Compositions by Miles Davis
Jazz compositions in G major